The Sultanate of Aceh, officially the Kingdom of Aceh Darussalam (Jawoë: كاورجاون اچيه دارالسلام), was a sultanate centered in the modern-day Indonesian province of Aceh. It was a major regional power in the 16th and 17th centuries, before experiencing a long period of decline. Its capital was Kutaraja, the present-day Banda Aceh.

At its peak it was a formidable enemy of the Sultanate of Johor and Portuguese-controlled Malacca, both on the Malayan Peninsula, as all three attempted to control the trade through the Strait of Malacca and the regional exports of pepper and tin with fluctuating success. In addition to its considerable military strength, the court of Aceh became a noted center of Islamic scholarship and trade.

History

Foundation and rise 
The sultanate was founded by Ali Mughayat Syah, who began campaigns to extend his control over northern Sumatra in 1520. His conquests included Deli, Pedir, and Pasai, and he attacked Aru. His son Alauddin al-Kahar (d. 1571) extended the domains farther south into Sumatra, but was less successful in his attempts to gain a foothold across the strait, though he made several attacks on both Johor and Malacca, with the support along with men and firearms from Suleiman the Magnificent's Ottoman Empire. The Ottoman Empire sent a relief force of 15 Xebecs commanded by Kurtoğlu Hızır Reis.

Aceh formed the northern tip of Sumatra at the southeast corner of the Bay of Bengal. Ships from the Bengal Sultanate transported diplomats from Sumatra and Brunei to Ming China.

On 21 June 1599 a Dutch captain, Cornelius de Houtman, arrived at "Acheen" aboard the Lioness as the first of three planned voyages to the East Indies. The crew stayed for three months acquiring pepper and other spices. British crew member John Davis claims the party was subsequently attacked by the local warlord with the loss of 68 dead and captured. After they arrived, they were permitted by the sultan to purchase pepper, during the same year as representatives of the English East India Company under the command of James Lancaster arrived. He returned in 1602 bearing a letter from English queen Elizabeth I.

The sultan from 1589 to 1604 was Alauddin Riayat Shah ibn Firman Shah. Internal dissension in the sultanate prevented another powerful sultan from appearing until 1607 when Iskandar Muda came to the position. He extended the sultanate's control over most of Sumatra. He also conquered Pahang, a tin-producing region of the Malayan Peninsula, and was able to force the sultans of Johor to recognise his overlordship, if temporarily. During his reign, he created a code of laws known as Adat Meukuta Alam (Adat meaning "customs", or "customary rules"). The strength of his formidable fleet was brought to an end with a disastrous campaign against Malacca in 1629 when the combined Portuguese and Johor forces managed to destroy all his ships and 19,000 troops according to Portuguese account. Aceh's forces were not destroyed, however, as Aceh was able to conquer Kedah within the same year and taking many of its citizens to Aceh. The sultan's son-in-law, Iskandar Thani, former prince of Pahang later became his successor. During his reign, Aceh focused on internal consolidation and religious unity.

After the reign of Sultan Iskandar Thani, Aceh was ruled by a series of female sultana. Aceh's previous policy of taking hostages from conquered kingdoms' population made them eager to seek independence, the results were Aceh's control weakened while regional rulers gained effective power. The sultan ultimately became a largely symbolic title. By the 1680s, a Persian visitor could describe a northern Sumatra where "every corner shelters a separate king or governor and all the local rulers maintain themselves independently and do not pay tribute to any higher authority."

Later years and conquest by the Dutch 
In 1699 Sultan Badr al-alam Syarif Hasyim Jamal ad-din ascended to the throne, the first male to rule in almost 60 years. He was succeeded by several short-lived rulers, and in 1727 a member of the Buginese dynasty, Sultan Ala ad-din Ahmad Shah took power. In the late 18th and early 19th centuries, Koh Lay Huan – the first Kapitan Cina of Penang, had good contacts with the English-and-French-speaking sultan of Aceh, Jauhar al-Alam. The sultan allowed Koh to gather pepper plants in Aceh to begin pepper cultivation in Penang. Later, about 1819, Koh helped Sultan Jauhar al-Alam put down a rebellion by Acehnese territorial chiefs.

In the 1820s, as Aceh produced over half the world's supply of pepper, a new leader, Tuanku Ibrahim, was able to restore some authority to the sultanate and gain control over the "pepper rajas" who were nominal vassals of the sultan by playing them off against each other. He rose to power during the sultanate of his brother, Muhammad Syah, and was able to dominate the reign of his successor Sulaiman Syah (r. 1838–1857), before taking the sultanate himself, under the title Sultan Ali Alauddin Mansur Syah (1857–1870). He extended Aceh's effective control southward at just the time when the Dutch were consolidating their holdings northward.

Britain, heretofore guarding the independence of Aceh to keep it out of Dutch hands, re-evaluated its policy and concluded the Anglo-Dutch Treaty of Sumatra, which allowed for Dutch control throughout Sumatra in exchange for concessions in the Gold Coast and equal trading rights in northern Aceh. The treaty was tantamount to a declaration of war on Aceh, and the Aceh War followed soon after in 1873, with the Dutch making the unfounded excuses that Aceh was sponsoring piracy and preparing to conclude a treaty with the United States. As the Dutch prepared for war, Mahmud Syah (1870–1874) appealed for international help, but no one was willing or able to assist.

In early 1874 the sultan abandoned the capital after the palace was captured on 31 January, withdrawing to the hills, while the Dutch announced the annexation of Aceh. He would die of cholera, as did many combatants on both sides, but the Acehnese proclaimed a grandson of Tuanku Ibrahim sultan. The local rulers of Acehnese ports nominally submitted to Dutch authority to avoid a blockade, but they used their income to support the resistance.

During this time, many Acehan politicians sought aid from the Ottoman Empire. Their efforts were futile, but they did serve to inspire resistance movements across south-east Asia. Local resistance in northern Sumatra then passed to the local lords and potentates, and then to the religious leaders. However, an adviser of the sultan, Abd al-Rahman al-Zahir, soon returned to take command of the independence movement, fell out with the revolutionary leaders, and promptly agreed to surrender himself to the Dutch in exchange for a lifetime pension in Mecca.

The Dutch, now hounded by locals and cholera alike, fortified their coastal positions and began a slow siege of the entire country, conducted by General van Pel. The capital, in particular, was surrounded by forts connected by railways. The Dutch made another serious attempt to finally pacify the country in 1884, but it quickly slowed and suffered from popular criticism. Dutch armies were finally able to make progress between 1898 and 1903, with each local potentate in occupied territories being forced to sign "The Short Declaration", a pledge of allegiance to the Dutch colonial overlords. Because of their co-operation, the Dutch were able to establish a fairly stable government in Aceh and get the sultan to surrender in 1903. After his exile in 1907, no successor was named, but the resistance continued to fight for some time, until 1912.

Political administration 
During the reign of Iskandar Muda (c.1538–1636), state centralization was carried out. This was done by removing or exterminating the present nobility and creating new ones that were friendly to the state. Besides this, the policy carried out the division of plots of land within the sultanate by mukim (similar to Christian parishes subdivisions), each of these mukims would be headed by an uleebalang (leader) who was responsible for security. Some regions of Aceh, especially of the western-producing pepper regions, were controlled by appointed panglima (governors) whose duty was to report on events and were rotated every three years.

Culture 

Aceh saw itself as heir to Pasai, the first Islamic state in Southeast Asia, and succeeded the role of Islamic missionary work of Malacca after it was conquered by the Catholic Portuguese. It was called the "porch of Mecca", and became a center of Islamic scholarship, where the Qur'an and other Islamic texts were translated into Malay. Its notable scholars included Hamzah Fansuri, Syamsuddin of Pasai, Abdurrauf of Singkil, and the Indian Nuruddin ar-Raniri.

Economy 
Aceh gained wealth from its export of pepper, nutmeg, cloves, betel nuts, and also tin once it conquered Pahang in 1617. Low-interest rates and the use of gold currency strengthened its economy. It was always somewhat fragile economically, however, because of the difficulty in providing enough surplus food to support the military and commercial adventures of the state. As Aceh lost political cohesion in the 17th century, it saw its trading importance yielded to the Dutch East India Company, who became the dominant military and economic power in the region following the successful siege of Malacca in 1641.

Rulers

Family tree of Acehnese monarchs

See also

 History of Indonesia
 The spread of Islam in Indonesia
 Ottoman expedition to Aceh
 Islam in Indonesia

Notes

References
 J.M. Barwise and N.J. White. A Traveller’s History of Southeast Asia. New York: Interlink Books, 2002.
 M.C. Ricklefs. A History of Modern Indonesia Since c. 1300, 2nd ed. Stanford: Stanford University Press, 1994.

External links
The History of Sumatra by William Marsden, c. 1800
Sejarah Aceh

Precolonial states of Indonesia
History of Aceh
Former sultanates

States and territories established in 1496
Islamic states in Indonesia
Aceh
Vassal states of the Ottoman Empire